Avenzoariidae is a family of feather mites in the  order Astigmata. There are at least 15 genera in Avenzoariidae. They are found on the feathers of aquatic birds, and in the case of one species, birds of prey.

Genera
These 15 genera belong to the family Avenzoariidae:

 Avenzoaria Oudemans, 1905
 Bdellorhynchus Megnin & Trouessart, 1884
 Bonnetella Trouessart, 1924
 Bregetovia Dubinin, 1951
 Bychovskiata Dubinin, 1951
 Capelloptes Dubinin, 1951
 Hemifreyana Gaud & Mouchet, 1959
 Laronyssus Dubinin, 1951
 Pomeranzevia Dubinin, 1951
 Pseudavenzoaria Dubinin, 1951
 Rafalskiata Mironov & Dabert, 1997
 Scutomegninia Dubinin, 1951
 Zachvatkinia Dubinin, 1949
 Zachvatkiniana Volgin, 1967
 Zygochelifer Atyeo, 1984

References

Further reading

External links

 

Sarcoptiformes
Acari families